Malec is a surname. It may refer to:

 Czesław Malec (1941–2018), Polish basketball player
 Ivo Malec (1925–2019), Croatian composer
 Jiří Malec (born 1962), Czech ski jumper
  (born 1966), Polish actress and singer
 Mariusz Malec (born 1995), Polish footballer
 Teodoro Petkoff Malec (1932–2018), Venezuelan politician
 Tomáš Malec (born 1982), Slovak ice hockey player
 Tomáš Malec (born 1993), Slovak footballer
 Vedrana Malec (born 1990), Croatian cross-country skier

See also
 

Czech-language surnames
Polish-language surnames
Slovak-language surnames